Heyman is the surname of:

 Alan Heyman (1931–2014), South Korean musicologist and composer
 Art Heyman (1941–2012), American basketball player
 David Heyman, British film producer
 Edward Heyman (1907–1981), American musician and lyricist
 George Heyman, Canadian politician
 Harry Heyman (1875–1932), American politician
 Joel Heyman, American voice actor
 John Heyman, British film producer
 Jon Heyman, American baseball writer
 Josiah Heyman, American anthropologist
 Kathryn Heyman, Australian writer
 Norma Heyman, British film producer
 Paul Heyman (born 1965), American wrestling manager
 Preston Heyman, British record producer, drummer and percussionist
 Richard A. Heyman (c. 1935–1994), American politician
 Richard X. Heyman, American singer-songwriter and musician
 Samuel J. Heyman, (1939–2009), American businessman and hedge fund manager
 Sophie Heyman (1915–2011), Belgian-born Spanish soprano commonly known as Sofía Noel

See also
 Heymann
 Heymans
 Heiman
 Hyman
 Hijmans